Ruffin is an unincorporated community in Colleton County, South Carolina, United States. Ruffin has a post office with ZIP code 29475, which opened on October 19, 1893.

References

Unincorporated communities in Colleton County, South Carolina
Unincorporated communities in South Carolina